The Panasonic Leica D Vario-Elmar 14-150mm F3.5-5.6 Asph Mega OIS is an interchangeable camera lens announced by Panasonic on March 7, 2007. Since it has been released, it is only produced in small qualities, this makes this product quite special. It features the Four Third Systems to assure its compatibility with different camera models.

In addition, it is the first Leica D lens that not only to support the zoom range to 300mm in 35mm format, but also to include the Extra Silent (XS) technology that drives the autofocusing motors to increase its performance on operation, responsiveness, accuracy and focusing stability.

References

14-150mm F3.5-5.6 Asph Mega OIS
Camera lenses introduced in 2007
Superzoom lenses